"Aa Jaan-E-Jaan" (English: Come here, my dear) is a song from the 1969 Hindi film Intaqam. It is one of the few cabaret songs sung by Lata Mangeshkar, and was a popular song in India from the 1960s. It was picturised on Helen.

Background
Lata Mangeshkar did not like singing cabaret songs and music directors would usually prefer Asha Bhosle for singing them. This song is an exception. The song was tuned and styled in accordance with Lata's style and preference. When asked about the song Lata Mangeshkar laughed and said, "I remember telling Laxmikant not to give me any cabaret songs to sing. He assured me I could sing it without a hitch. Aa jaan-e-jaan was tailored to suit my taste and style." The song became an instant hit on the charts with Helen dancing syn chronically with the complete song.

Cover versions
A remixed version of the song was also featured in the dance music album, Dance Masti Forever (2006) by band, Instant Karma as Aa Jaan-E-Jaan (The Baby Can You Feel The Magic Mix). Another remix version was done by DJ Suketu from the album WILD 10. Another cover version of the song was featured in film, Hello Darling (2010) as item number performed by Celina Jaitley. It was sung by Antara Mitra and Akriti Kakkar.

References

1969 songs
Hindi film songs
Lata Mangeshkar songs
Songs with lyrics by Anand Bakshi
Songs with music by Laxmikant–Pyarelal